Uptown Ruler: Soul Gestures in Southern Blue, Vol. 2 is an album by Wynton Marsalis that was released in 1991. It is part two of the three-part blues cycle recorded by Marsalis and his quintet.

Track listing

Personnel
 Wynton Marsalis – trumpet
 Reginald Veal – double bass, trombone
 Marcus Roberts – piano, alto saxophone
 Todd Williams – tenor saxophone
 Herlin Riley – double bass, drums

Production
 George Butler – executive producer
 Steven Epstein – producer
 Stanley Crouch – liner notes

References

1991 albums
Albums produced by George Butler (record producer)
Columbia Records albums
Wynton Marsalis albums